Kathryn "Katie" McCamant is an American architect and author based in Nevada City, California. She is known for her work developing the concept of cohousing in the United States, including authoring two books on the topic. She and her partner Charles Durrett designed more than 55 cohousing communities across the United States.

Education 
McCamant has a B.A. in architecture from University of California, Berkeley and a graduate degree from the Royal Academy of Art and Architecture in Copenhagen, Denmark.

Work
They originally came across the idea while in graduate school at the University of Copenhagen, and they returned to Denmark in 1984 to study the concept in depth. Cohousing is a type of intentional community composed of small private homes with full kitchens, supplemented by extensive common facilities. A cohousing community is planned, owned and managed by the residents, groups of people who want more interaction with their neighbors.

McCamant and Durrett designed Muir Commons, the first cohousing community in North America. The project began after McCamant and Durrett gave a lecture in Davis, California and then returned to help develop the community. Their former Nevada City, California firm, McCamant & Durrett Architects, designed 55 cohousing communities in North America. Cohousing has moved into different regions of the United States including the New York area and Nevada where McCamant lives as of 2021. 

McCamant has spoken with The New York Times about co-housing in the United States, how it differs from communal living, early challenges for establishing cohousing in the United States, and the need for developers and the community to work together in developing the project. She describes cohousing developments as similar to an extended family, with the added benefit of being ecofriendly.

Awards and honors 
In 2001, McCamant was a co-recipient of the United Nations World Habitat Award for her work in designing the East Lake Commons Conservation Community in Atlanta, GA. She and Durrett received an award for mixed-use development that was jointly presented by the American Institute of Architects and the United States Department of Housing and Urban Development. In 2007, she was awarded the Vision 2020 Award of the Sierra Business Council. In 2008, the National Association of Home Builders honored McCamant and Durant with the Energy Value Housing Award and the Silver Award for Best of Senior Living. McCamant and Durrett won the 2011 California Governor’s Environmental and Economic Leadership Award.

Selected publications

; reviewed in

See also 
 Sunward Cohousing

References

External links
CoHousing Solutions

1959 births
Living people
20th-century American architects
21st-century American architects
People from Nevada City, California
Architects from California